Narmadapuram Railway Station is a railway station serving Narmadapuram town, in Narmadapuram district of Madhya Pradesh State of India. It is under Bhopal railway division of West Central Railway zone of Indian Railways. It is located on New Delhi–Chennai main line of the Indian Railways.

It is located at 309 m above sea level and has two platforms. As of 2016, an electrified double broad gauge railway line exists and at this station, 54 trains stop. Bhopal Airport is at distance of 75 kilometers.

References

Bhopal railway division
Railway stations in Hoshangabad district